The Japanese destroyer {{nihongo|Asakaze|朝風|”Morning Wind”}} was one of nine  destroyers built for the Imperial Japanese Navy (IJN) during the 1920s. During the Pacific War, she participated in the Philippines Campaign in December 1941 and the Dutch East Indies Campaign in early 1942. She took part in the Battle of Sunda Strait in March and helped to sink two Allied cruisers.

Design and description
The Kamikaze class was an improved version of the s. They were powered by two Parsons geared steam turbines, each driving one propeller shaft, using steam provided by four Kampon water-tube boilers. During sea trials, the ships comfortably exceeded their designed speeds, reaching . Their crew consisted of 148 officers and crewmen.

The main armament of the Kamikaze-class ships consisted of four  Type 3 guns in single mounts; one gun forward of the superstructure, one between the two funnels and the last pair back to back atop the aft superstructure. The guns were numbered '1' to '4' from front to rear. The ships carried three above-water twin sets of  torpedo tubes; one mount was between the forward superstructure and the forward gun and the other two were between the aft funnel and aft superstructure.

Early in the war, the No. 4 gun and the aft torpedo tubes were removed in exchange for four depth charge throwers and 18 depth charges. In addition 10 license-built  Type 96 light AA guns were installed. Survivors had their light AA armament augmented to be between thirteen and twenty 25 mm guns and four  Type 93 anti-aircraft machineguns by June 1944.

Construction and career
Asakaze, built by Mitsubishi at their shipyard in Nagasaki, was laid down on 16 February 1922, launched on 8 December 1922 and completed on 16 June 1923. Originally commissioned simply as Destroyer No. 3, the ship was assigned the name Asakaze on 1 August 1928.

Pacific War
At the time of the attack on Pearl Harbor on 7 December 1941, Asakaze was part of Destroyer Squadron 5 under Destroyer Division 5 in the IJN 3rd Fleet, and deployed from Mako Guard District in the Pescadores as part of the Japanese invasion force for the Operation M (the invasion of the Philippines), during which time she helped screen landings of Japanese forces at and at Lingayen Gulf.

In early 1942, Asakaze was assigned to escorting troop convoys to Singora, Malaya and French Indochina. Assigned to Operation J (the invasion of Java in the Netherlands East Indies), she participated at the Battle of Sunda Strait on 1 March. During that battle, she launched torpedoes at the light cruiser  and heavy cruiser .

On 10 March, Asakaze and Destroyer Division 5 were reassigned to the Southwest Area Fleet and escorted troop convoys from Singapore to Penang, and Rangoon, and covered landings of Japanese troops in the Nicobar Islands as part of Operation D on 11 June. From late July 1942–February 1943, Asakaze was assigned to patrols between Ambon and Timor in the Netherlands East Indies. At the end of February, she  was based out of Saigon, and assigned to convoy escort duties between Takao and Moji, Kyūshū. She refitted at Sasebo Naval Arsenal at the end of May, and resumed her convoy escort duties to Saipan and Manila through August 1944.

On 24 August, Asakaze sortied from Takao as escort for a convoy bound for Manila when she was torpedoed by the submarine . Asakaze was struck from the Navy List on 10 October.

Notes

References
 

 

 

Kamikaze-class destroyers (1922)
Ships built by Mitsubishi Heavy Industries
1922 ships
World War II destroyers of Japan
Ships sunk by American submarines
World War II shipwrecks in the South China Sea
Maritime incidents in August 1944
Shipwrecks of the Philippines
Shipwrecks in the South China Sea